The Minister of Industry and Trade is the head of the Ministry of Industry and Trade of the Government of Tanzania.

History
Previously, the industry and trade portfolios existed under separate ministries before being amalgamated into its present form.

List of Ministers
The following have served the ministry:
 Parties

References

External links